The Agriculture Act 1993 (c. 37) is an Act of Parliament. The Act ended the Milk Marketing Board and the Potato Marketing Scheme.

It then terminated the national price support arrangements for wool and potatoes and amended the Industrial Organisation and Development Act 1947.

References

External links

United Kingdom Legislation 

United Kingdom Acts of Parliament 1993